The Longteng Bridge, officially known as the Yutengping Bridge, is a former bridge in Longteng Village, Sanyi Township, Miaoli County, Taiwan.

History

The bridge was built in 1906 during Japanese rule, and was named . It was designed by the American civil engineers Theodore Cooper and C.C. Schneider for the colonial government. Both the bridge and nearby village (modern-day Longteng) were named  after a local plant Millettia pachycarpa believed to be poisonous to fish; legends believed that a malevolent carp in a nearby lake was responsible for misfortune, and residents planted the shrub to counter the carp. The original design consists of a central steel truss flanked by multiple brick masonry arch approaches.

The April 1935 Shinchiku-Taichū earthquake and subsequent aftershocks in July damaged the bridge beyond repair. Several masonry arches were cracked and the north and south ends of the truss became misaligned. A new iron bridge was built in 1938, 80 meters to the west of Longteng Bridge, and the central truss was dismantled once the new bridge opened. Longteng of the bridge's common name is from the name of Longteng Village and gained use after the Japanese handover of Taiwan.

The 1999 921 earthquake caused one of the remaining piers to collapse and as a result, the county government decided to rededicate the bridge's remains as a monument to the two deadliest earthquakes in Taiwan's history. It was placed on the list of Taiwan's Cultural Heritage Assets (Historical Site #KA09602001112) on 25 November 2003.

Architecture

The 1938 bridge stands at 50 meters tall and 200 meters long, making it the highest iron bridge in Taiwan.

The ruined 1907 bridge piers are covered with white tung tree flowers every year from April to May, marking the height of its popularity as a tourist and hiking destination.

Transportation
The bridge is accessible by taxi south from Sanyi Station of Taiwan Railways Administration.

Between 2010 and 2011, the station was accessible by Yutengping Station, which has since been removed.

See also
 Transportation in Taiwan

References

External links

 
 
 

Bridges to nowhere
1907 establishments in Taiwan
Bridges completed in 1907
Buildings and structures in Miaoli County